Tiësto in Concert is a DVD and Blu-ray of Tiësto's concert on May 10, 2003, at the Gelredome in Arnhem, Gelderland, Netherlands, when he performed before an audience of over 25,000 people. The concert was divided into parties with live performances by groups, bands and artists representing a country, which in turn represented a continent. It begins with a presentation by Tiësto followed by a live performance by Andain who presents to Britain and Europe. Then, a group of carnival Sanba presents to Brazil and South America. The singer's live performance and band Dinand Woesthoff presents "The Star-Spangled Banner" to the United States. The Chinese group Orange Studio performs the theme "Tiësto in Concert Asia", presented to countries there. After a live performance by singer Jan Johnston, Omar Ka & Fula Band presents to Africa, and finally, the live performance of Jerry de Jonge & Beijerink presents to Australia and Oceania.

Video listing

Release history

References

 Discogs

External links

 

Tiësto video albums
2003 video albums
Live video albums
2003 live albums